Nick Coleman (born 1960) is a British writer.

Born in Buckinghamshire in 1960, Coleman grew up in Cambridgeshire and now lives in London. He is a former music editor of Time Out and an arts and music journalist for The Independent and The Independent on Sunday. In 2012 he wrote The Train in the Night: A Story of Music and Loss,  about coming to terms with his own experience five years earlier of hearing loss.

He has also written a number of other non-fiction books as well as novels, including Pillow Man (2015),
 which was a runner-up for the McKitterick Prize.

References

External links

1960 births
Living people
21st-century English male writers
21st-century British non-fiction writers
British deaf people
English male non-fiction writers
Hearing loss
The Independent people
People from Buckinghamshire
People from Cambridgeshire